SS Republic was an ocean liner built in 1871 by Harland and Wolff for White Star Line. It was intended to be the last of four vessels forming the Oceanic class, before two new ships were commissioned. After a rough maiden voyage from Liverpool to New York City on 1 February 1872, the ship was chosen to be on White Star Line's first voyage on the South Atlantic and Pacific line with four other ships, destined for Chile. In 1874, the construction of modern ships SS Germanic and SS Britannic led to SS Republics becoming the standby vessel of White Star Line. It occupied this position for 15 years, and attempts were made to modernise it in 1888. When RMS Teutonic and RMS Majestic entered service in the following year, the Republic became surplus to White Star's needs.

Republic was sold in 1889 to Holland America Line and was renamed Maasdam, and served with the company for twelve years. In 1902, it was sold to Italian company La Veloce where it was renamed Vittoria, before being renamed again to Città di Napoli. It was used for many years to transport Italian migrants to America. It was retired in 1908, and was lent to the Italian government to house victims of the 1908 Messina earthquake. The ship was scrapped in 1910 in Genoa.

During its service it could carry a varying number of passengers; under White Star Line it could carry 166 first class and over 1,000 steerage passengers; under Holland America Line it could carry 150 first class, 60 second class, and 800 steerage passengers' and as a migrant ship it could carry 1,424 steerage passengers. The facilities on the ship were described as a "floating palace" when it was owned by White Star Line, and were similar to RMS Oceanic, but were slightly modernised.

History

White Star Line
When Thomas Henry Ismay established White Star Line in 1867, he came to an agreement with Gustav Christian Schwabe in return for financial assistance. Ismay promised to build the company's future ships in Harland and Wolff's shipyards in Belfast, which had been founded by Schwabe's nephew Gustav Wilhelm Wolff. Four ships were originally commissioned to form the Oceanic class, but this was later expanded to six. Republic was the fourth ship of the class and was launched on 4 July 1871; its name notes the date it was launched was Independence Day in the United States.

The ship's maiden voyage took place on 1 February 1872, from Liverpool to New York City, stopping at Queenstown. This trip damaged the ship; a rainstorm flooded the engine room and boiler room, and a lifeboat was damaged, seriously injuring a sailor. This incident led White Star Line to reconsider their routes, and they found that ships with the most freedom of movement rarely suffered damage.

At the end of 1872, all six Oceanic class ships were in service, but White Star Line only required five. Ismay attempted to compete with the Pacific Steam Navigation Company on the line of the South Atlantic and the Pacific, destined for Chile.  Republic was chosen to serve this route with two smaller mixed-liners, SS Asiatic and SS Tropic, and two other ships, SS Gaelic and SS Belgic.

Faced with this offensive, the Pacific Steam Navigation Company attempted to construct a vessel capable of competing with Republic, the Tacora. Both ships participated in a race between Liverpool and Callao in October 1871; the Tacora was unable to travel beyond Montevideo, but Republic successfully completed the journey. Despite the success of the trip, Republic was placed back on the route to New York, while the South Atlantic and Pacific routes were cancelled, as they were too expensive.

Reserve vessel

In 1874, White Star Line had two modern ships produced, the SS Britannic and the SS Germanic. The Republic was deemed unnecessary for the regular service to New York and became a standby vessel for the company. Despite this, the SS Republic was used repeatedly in the future, whenever one of the modern vessels had to undergo repairs or maintenance. On 8 August 1875, she discovered the Norwegian barque Velox abandoned in the Atlantic Ocean. Some of her crew were put aboard with the intention of taking Velox in to Queenstown, County Cork.

In February 1879, the ship was badly damaged after being struck on the River Mersey by schooner Ocean Queen. In December of the same year, the Republic faced rough seas during a crossing of the Atlantic, and its smokestack was damaged and had to be repaired by the crew. In December 1880, Republic was damaged and was meant to be towed by German steam vessel Mosel. This vessel did not have enough coal, but Republic managed to reach New York a few days later without assistance. On 9 February 1883, Republic rescued 44 survivors from the Warren Line steamship , which had foundered in the Atlantic Ocean. One of her crew was lost effecting the rescue.

In 1885, White Star Line briefly provided Inman Line with SS Baltic, as they were having financial difficulties. The Republic temporarily served as the replacement for this ship. On 20 September 1885, the Republic collided with the Cunard Line steamer Aurania while leaving the port of New York, following the error of a coast pilot. Republic was sufficiently damaged for the journey to be cancelled, and the ship was put into dry dock.

In 1888, the Republic underwent a redesign, and a second class was added. In January 1889, the ship began its final voyage with White Star Line under the command of Edward Smith, who later became the captain of the RMS Titanic. On 27 January, the ship was grounded a few hours before its arrival in New York; an incident near the boilers killed three trimmers and seriously injured several others. Despite this, the ship underwent repairs and made its last voyage to England.

Flagging and retirement
The arrival of Teutonic in 1889 and the announcement of RMS Majestic made the Republic unnecessary, and it was put up for sale. It was purchased in June 1889 by the Holland America Line, which paid £35,000 to acquire it. Renamed Maasdam, it was immediately sent to G. Forrester & Co. in Liverpool for an overhaul of machinery (for more economical and effective machines) and a reorganisation of its facilities. Once this overhaul was completed, the Maasdam was able to carry 150 first class passengers, 60 second class passengers, and 800 steerage/third class passengers. From 15 March 1890, it served on a route between Rotterdam and New York, and was not damaged during its service with the Holland America Line, which satisfied the company. In 1902, a brief stopover at Boulogne-sur-Mer was added to the route to New York.

In 1902, it was sold to Italian company La Veloce, which first renamed it Vittoria, before quickly switching it to Città di Napoli. The ship transported migrants from Genoa, Naples, Palermo, and Gibraltar to New York, and underwent an overhaul which increased its capacity to 1,424 steerage passengers. Its first voyage with the company began on 30 September 1902. Città di Napoli was used until 27 April 1907, when it was withdrawn by the company.

After the 1908 Messina earthquake, La Veloce lent Città di Napoli, North America, and Savoia to the Italian government, in order to shelter the victims. La Veloce re-obtained the ship in 1909, and it was scrapped in Genoa the following year. With a lifetime of 38 years, the ship was the last of the Oceanic class to be scrapped.

Features
Republic shared many characteristics with those of the first liner in the Oceanic series, Oceanic, constructed in 1870. Republic measured  and had a gross register tonnage of 3708. It could be powered by sail, with four masts, but also had smokestacks painted the colours of White Star Line, brown and black. Its machines came from G. Forrester & Co. of Liverpool and were two reciprocating engines (able to accommodate two cylinders), similar to those of the RMS Atlantic. Although it could theoretically reach speeds of 14.5 knots, it never managed to reach that speed. When the ship was renamed to Maasdam, its propulsion system was redesigned and was equipped with alternative machines, and could support three cylinders.

Republic, like Oceanic, was initially able to carry 1,000 steerage passengers and 166 in first class. The facilities on the Oceanic revolutionized nautical travel, earning it the nickname of "imperial yacht", as it had facilities for wealthy passengers and was more stable than other ships. The first class passengers had bathtubs, a dining room, and chairs rather than benches. There is no precise information regarding the facilities of the Republic, but it is thought that it was similar to Oceanic, but had been improved. A passenger in 1874 described Republic as a "floating palace, with the style and comfort of a Swiss hotel", and said their room was welcoming and gold, and the ship contained a piano, library, smoking room, and barber.

When the ship became the Maasdam, the liner was able to accommodate 150 first class, 60 second class, and 800 steerage passengers. Finally, when it was designed to transport migrants, it could accommodate 1,424 steerage passengers.

Notes

References

Ships built in Belfast
Steamships of the United Kingdom
Ships of the White Star Line
1871 ships
Ships built by Harland and Wolff
Passenger ships of the United Kingdom
Maritime incidents in February 1879
Passenger ships of Italy
Steamships of Italy
Passenger ships of the Netherlands
Steamships of the Netherlands